The First Universalist Church of Lyons, Ohio, located at 145 East Morenci Street, Lyons, Ohio is a member congregation of the Unitarian Universalist Association.

History
The congregation first gathered in 1852; the church building was first constructed in 1868; an extensive renovation took place in 1904.  The land for the church was donated by Jinks Morey, who was a Universalist and the founder of Morey's Corners, now known as Lyons, Ohio.  The church building is the oldest remaining non-residential structure in Royalton Township, Fulton County, Ohio. A bronze plaque issued by the Fulton County Historical Society reads as follows:

 THE FIRST UNIVERSALIST CHURCH
 Congregation gathered in 1852
 Church Dedicated October 18, 1868
 Renovated and rededicated:
 December 4, 1904
 Erected on land donated by Jinks Morey,
 Universalist and founder of
 Morey's Corners, now Lyons, Ohio.
 Oldest Royalton Township non-residential
 structure remaining on its original site.
 Fulton County Historical Society
 Historic Building

Links
First Universalist Church of Lyons
Unitarian Universalist Association

References

Buildings and structures in Fulton County, Ohio
Unitarian Universalist churches in Ohio